Jim Renner (born October 31, 1983) is an American professional golfer.

Renner attended Bishop Feehan High School in Attleboro, Massachusetts, the University of Oklahoma and Johnson & Wales University (Florida), where he won the 2005 NAIA Championship.

Renner earned his 2011 PGA Tour card by finishing T-22 at qualifying school. He made only 11 cuts in 22 tournaments in 2011 and played on the Web.com Tour in 2012 and 2013. He finished 17th on the 2013 Web.com Tour regular season money list to earn his 2014 PGA Tour card.

In 2016, he was medalist at the Web.com Tour qualifying school to regain his Web.com Tour card for 2017.

Professional wins
this list may be incomplete
2008 Massachusetts Open, Vermont Open, Rhode Island Open
2009 Maine Open, Dothan Classic (NGA Hooters Tour)
2010 Sunset Hills NGA Classic (NGA Hooters Tour)

See also
2010 PGA Tour Qualifying School graduates
2013 Web.com Tour Finals graduates

References

External links

Profile on University of Oklahoma's athletic site

American male golfers
Oklahoma Sooners men's golfers
PGA Tour golfers
Korn Ferry Tour graduates
Golfers from Massachusetts
Johnson & Wales University alumni
Sportspeople from Boston
People from Plainville, Massachusetts
1983 births
Living people